The Bob Years is a compilation of songs from Virginia Coalition's repertoire from 1998's The Colors of the Sound through 2004's OK to Go.  The album also contains two previously unreleased tracks.

Track listing
 "Come and Go" - 2:40
 "Dalai Lama" - 3:41
 "Go Go Tech" - 4:51
 "Green and Grey" - 4:23
 "Jerry Jermaine" - 4:23
 "Johnny Wonder" - 3:10
 "Likeness" - 3:25
 "Lonely Cowboy" - 3:19
 "Maize" - 2:42
 "Mista Banks" - 4:51
 "Motown" - 4:46
 "Nicole's Song" - 5:04
 "Ok To Go" - 4:11
 "Sink Slowly" - 2:04
 "Stella" - 2:58
 "The End Of The Road" - 3:47
 "The River 1873" - 4:01
 "This Is Him (Hurricane Song)" - 3:27
 "Walk To Work" - 3:31
 "Zymurgy" - 0:45

2005 compilation albums
Virginia Coalition albums